The 2014 Mid-American Conference men's soccer tournament was the 21st edition of the four-team tournament.  The tournament decided the Mid-American Conference champion and guaranteed representative into the 2014 NCAA Division I Men's Soccer Championship. The Akron Zips are the two-time defending champions.

Qualification 

Akron, West Virginia, Bowling Green and Western Michigan qualified for the tournament by having the best regular season conference records.

Bracket

Schedule

Semifinals

Championship

Tournament Best XI 

 Clint Caso, Akron
 Sam Gainford, Akron
 Adam Najem, Akron
 Victor Souto, Akron
 Max Auden, Bowling Green
 Nick Landsberger, Bowling Green
 Jacob Roth, Bowling Green
 Andy Bevin, West Virginia
 Jamie Merriam, West Virginia
 Greg Timmer, Western Michigan
 Nick Wysong, Western Michigan

See also 
 Mid-American Conference Men's Soccer Tournament
 2014 Mid-American Conference men's soccer season
 2014 NCAA Division I men's soccer season
 2014 NCAA Division I Men's Soccer Championship

References 

2014 Mid-American Conference men's soccer season
MAC Men's Soccer
Soccer in Ohio